Chandeliers are an electronic ensemble from Chicago, IL. The group was formed in 2005 by Chris Kalis, Dan Jugle, Scott McGaughey, and Travis Murphy and is based out of the Shape Shoppe recording studio/loft in Chicago. The group's recordings and live performances cover an array of different musical styles and their sound has been likened to musicians such as Kraftwerk, Can, Chris Carter, Giorgio Moroder. Chandeliers have released four albums: The Thrush (2008), Dirty Moves (2009), Roulé (2011), and Founding Fathers (2012). The group has toured nationally and has performed live musical scores to Wallace Berman's Aleph, Emlen Etting's Oramunde, The Junky's Christmas animated short, and Marcell Jankovics' Son of the White Mare.

Discography

Albums
 2008 –  The Thrush (Pickled Egg Records/ Obey Your Brain ) - CD / LP 
 2009 –  Dirty Moves (Pickled Egg Records / Captcha Records) - CD / LP
 2011 –  Roulé (split with Mahjongg (band)) (Captcha Records) - LP
 2012 –  Founding Fathers (Captcha Records) - LP 
 2017 –  Law of Fives (Potions Music) - Cassette / digital

EPs and singles
 2006 –  Circulation EP (Ghost Arcade, LTD) – 7" vinyl
 2013 –  Unheard Intensities b/w Time Drive - (Notes and Bolts Records) – 7" vinyl
 2017 –  Cruisin''' (split with Songs for Gods) - (Potions Music) – 7" vinyl / digital
 2018 –  High Diamond b/w Snake Bomb' - (Potions Music) – 7" vinyl / digital

Remixes
 2012 – Sinkane Runnin (Phonica Records Special Editions) - 12" vinyl
 2016 – TRUE Colors of My Estimation (Mouthwatering Records)

Film Scores 
 2017 –  Orders'' (dir. Eric Marsh & Andrew Stasiulis)

References

External links

Chandeliers on Bandcamp
Chandeliers official website. 
Chandeliers session on Daytrotter.

Musical groups established in 2005
American experimental musical groups